In mathematics, in the field of group theory, a subgroup  of a group  is termed malnormal if for any  in  but not in ,  and  intersect in the identity element.

Some facts about malnormality:

An intersection of malnormal subgroups is malnormal.
Malnormality is transitive, that is, a malnormal subgroup of a malnormal subgroup is malnormal.
The trivial subgroup and the whole group are malnormal subgroups. A normal subgroup that is also malnormal must be one of these.
Every malnormal subgroup is a special type of C-group called a trivial intersection subgroup or TI subgroup.

When G  is finite, a malnormal subgroup H  distinct from 1 and G is called a "Frobenius complement". The set  N  of elements of  G  which are, either equal to 1, or non-conjugate to any
element of  H,  is a normal subgroup of  G, called the "Frobenius kernel", and  G  is the semi-direct product of  H  and  N (Frobenius' theorem).

References

Subgroup properties